Solar is a townland of 42 acres in County Antrim, Northern Ireland. It is situated in the civil parish of Carncastle and the historic barony of Glenarm Upper.

Archaeology
The sites of a church and graveyard in the townland are registered as Scheduled Historic Monuments at grid ref: D3440 1220  and an Early Christian cemetery was excavated in 1993. This revealed over 120 burials dated from the 7th to 12th centuries. Some burials had been disturbed by a stone-lined pit of Anglo-Norman date.

See also 
List of townlands in County Antrim
List of places in County Antrim

References

Townlands of County Antrim
Civil parish of Carncastle
Archaeological sites in County Antrim